The capture of the frigate Esmeralda was a naval operation conducted on the nights of 5 and 6 November 1820. A division of boats with sailors and marines of the First Chilean Navy Squadron, commanded by Thomas Cochrane, stealthily advanced towards Callao and captured the ship through a boarding attack.  was the flagship of Spanish fleet and the main objective of the operation. She was protected by a strong military defense that the royalists had organized in the port.

Both Chilean and Spanish historiography considers that as a result of this naval action the importance or maritime influence of the Spanish Navy in the Pacific disappeared completely. British historians Brian Vale and David J. Cubitt follow the same line of opinion when affirming that Spain had unquestionably lost control of the sea against the Chilean Navy.

Background
On 20 August 1820, the Liberating Expedition commanded by General José de San Martín sailed from Valparaíso to Peru. This force was escorted by the Chilean fleet, under the command of Vice Admiral Cochrane.

From the beginning of the campaign, San Martín and Cochrane had differences regarding the military strategy that they should carry out in Peru. The first wanted to avoid direct fighting, win over the population and press with indirect actions toward Lima. The second wanted to give a decisive blow to the royalists with both army and navy. San Martín's line of thought prevailed.

The expeditionary force arrived on 7 September in Paracas, near Pisco. San Martin established his headquarters to put pressure on the royalists. The Viceroy Juaquin de la Pezuela entered into negotiations with San Martin, based on the new political situation in the Iberian Peninsula with the proclamation of the Spanish Constitution of 1812. However, the negotiations that took place between the end of September and the beginning of October did not prosper.

At the beginning of October, San Martin sent a division of the army to the Peruvian highlands to revolutionize the territory, giving the command of this force to General Juan Antonio Álvarez de Arenales.

On 9 October 1820, the garrison of Guayaquil mutinied and proclaimed the independence of the city. This event had material and moral consequences in favor of the revolutionary cause in Peru.

On 26 October, the expeditionary force left Pisco to the north, arriving on the 29th in front of the Callao. The next day, San Martin went to Ancón with the purpose of executing military operations on land. For his part, Cochrane occupied the island of San Lorenzo and stayed at the port's approaches to establish a rigorous blockade with several ships.

Blockade of Callao

Inactivity of the Spanish Navy

Since the arrival in September of the liberating expedition to the Peruvian coast, the Spanish Navy had not accomplished any effective actions to repel or at least harass the revolutionaries, granting them control of the sea. This was due to the inflexible defensive policy of the Viceroy Pezuela, and the incompetence of the Commanding General of Navy Antonio Vacaro.

The Spanish fleet, based in Callao, was mainly formed by the frigates Prueba, Venganza and Esmeralda, together with several other armed ships. The first two frigates, commanded by Captain José Villegas, left the port on 10 October to the Peruvian south with the purpose  of embarking troops, leaving the third frigate and the other ships under the impressive defense of the port, constituting a floating palisade that was protected with gunboats and batteries. Vacaro made this third naval unit the flagship of the squadron under his command.

The Cochrane plan
The blockade was maintained without difficulty by the Chilean fleet, since the Spanish fleet remained entirely on the defensive. However, this inactivity, made Cochrane impatient, and led him to undertake naval action.

To break the monotony of the blockade, he planned to inflict a great blow on the royalists in their strong defenses, similar to the capture of the defensive system of Valdivia. On the basis of his own information and that of a subordinate, he decided to undertake a surprise assault, entering the port at night with several boats and seizing the Esmeralda by means of a boarding attack. As a complement to this plan, he intended to capture or burn the other ships.

Cochrane began preparations for the attack that he had personally decided to direct, with his usual attention to detail. For three days, the crew was trained to row silently and climb the sides of the ships, without informing them of their plan. On 1 November he had given instructions for the attack to his immediate subordinates. On the night of 4 November, he practiced a reconnaissance in the bay, which was a trial of the operation executed the next night.

At dawn on 5 November, final preparations were made for the attack, and a speech by Cochrane was read to motivate the crew.

Opposing forces

Chilean Navy
Cochrane gathered 240 men for the attack, of which 160 were chosen sailors and 80 were marines. It occupied 92 men of O'Higgins, 99 of Lautaro and 49 of Independencia.

Regarding the nationality of the crew belonging to the navy that was chosen for the attack, Chilean historian Lopez Urrutia, and also Cubitt, give some figures:

They embarked on 14 oared boats, divided into two groups:

 The first group, formed by seven boats of O'Higgins, commanded by Captain Thomas Crosbie.
 The second group, formed by seven boats from Lautaro and Independencia, commanded by Captain Martin Guise.

Cochrane joined the first group to direct the attack, leaving Captain Robert Foster in charge of all the ships in his absence.

For the attack, they were armed with pistols, boarding axes, daggers or machetes, and short pikes. The attackers wore white jackets with a blue armband for recognition. If the clothes were not visible in the dark, the words "Gloria" and "Victoria" would be used as a signal.

The oars of the boats were wrapped in canvas to muffle noise when moving in the water.

Spanish Navy and defense of the port
The Spanish Navy stationed in Callao, under the command of Vacaro, consisted:

 Flagship Esmeralda (40 guns), commanded by Captain Luis Coig.

On the frigate, in addition to the sailors, were on board some troops of the Real Carlos battalion and army gunners. There was a crew of 313 between officers and men.

 Brig Maipú (16 guns), under the command of Lieutenant Antonio Madroño.
 Brig Pezuela (20 guns), under the command of Lieutenant Ramón Bañuelos.
 Pailebot Aránzazu (11 guns), commanded by his private pilot Juan Agustín de Ibarra.

There were also 14 to 24 gunboats and an undetermined number of armed merchant ships.

In addition to the naval squadron, there was the artillery of the fortresses and batteries of the port in charge of Brigadier Juan Francisco Sánchez, which consisted:

 Fortresses of Real Felipe, San Rafael and San Miguel.
 Batteries of the Arsenal and San Juaquín.

The defensive formation of the realists consisted of a floating barrier formed by trunks attached to chains, which protected the approaches to the ships and left only a small opening for entry or exit. This floating chain was guarded by the gunboats, and behind this chain were anchored Esmeralda, Maipú (these two at the northern end of the roadstead) Pezuela and Aránzazu, forming the head of the line of ships. In the rear were the armed merchant ships. All this defensive disposition of the squadron was also protected by the batteries of the port. It was an imposing defensive disposition.

Battle

On the afternoon of 5 November, Cochrane ordered Lautaro and Independencia to sea, leaving O'Higgins near the island of San Lorenzo, and on its hidden side, the boats with their crew destined to attack. With this movement he succeeded in deceiving the royalists.

At 10 o'clock at night, the boats separated from O'Higgins, approaching the entrance of the floating chain that protected the Spanish ships. The boats advanced in two parallel columns under Crosbie and Guise.

The Chilean force sailed to reach the coast near the battery of San Juaquín, which defended the northern end of the port, and then went between the San Miguel fortress and the anchorage of neutral ships, hiding them from view. The neutrals were very close to the opening of the floating chain. When passing through that place, they found the frigates USS Macedonian and HMS Hyperion, which were the closest to the entrance of the royalist defense. The American ship, upon seeing them, wished them good luck in the attack, while the British hailed the boats to establish their identities. The hail was not heard by the royalists in the port. All this silent movement carried out until now to approach the roadstead had lasted two hours.

At midnight, the boats arrived at the entrance to the floating chain barrier and saw a gunboat guarding the place, with a lieutenant and 14 men on board, so they approached and surprised her, managing to capture her with the crew and preventing an alert. They then passed the chain, and at approximately 12:30 a.m. on 6 November, they approached Esmeralda and boarded from opposite sides simultaneously. Crosbie's column, at whose head was Cochrane, attacked to starboard, while Guise's column to port. At that time, Coig was in the cabin talking to some officers, and the crew was sleeping, many of them on the deck. Only the guards were on watch.

The sleepy crew, newly aware of the attack, took up arms to counter-attack, but as Cochrane later stated: "the Chilean machetes did not give them much time to organize and recover their spirit". But in spite of the surprise, they gave some resistance in the places that were attacked, giving rise to a bloody fight with sharp weapons and firearms. However, the impetus of the Chilean attack was irresistible and soon occupied  the quarterdeck, the frigate's quarters and the stern.

The royalists were pushed to the forecastle, and there they withstood the attack bravely until the forces of Crosbie and Guise united and charged upon the position. Some of the attackers, who, according to the instructions, had climbed to the tops in the first moments of the boarding, fired down from this height. Having occupied the bow, Guise cleared the lower deck of the troops that were firing upwards through the hatches. Shortly before 1 a.m. the attackers were in possession of the ship, and the royalist crew that survived surrendered. During the fight, Cochrane received a blow at the beginning and in the final stage a shot that pierced his thigh, leading him to sit on the deck and try to direct the attack as best he could.

The fight in Esmeralda alerted the batteries, gunboats and other ships in the port . Fugitives of the frigate who threw themselves into the sea to escape and reported to other ships that she had been captured.

When the fight ended in Esmeralda, Cochrane tried to execute the next complement of his plan, but without success. The failure stemmed from the actions of crew members, in the midst of the victory, who began to loot the ship and got drunk with the alcohol they found. When some officers urged them to return to the boats to continue the attack against the other Spanish ships, they flatly refused, saying that they had done enough. The few sailors that the officers managed to embark attacked Maipú and Pezuela, but were repelled by the by-now prepared ships, with the support of several gunboats directed byVacaro, who was patrolling the bay. However, the Spanish commander could not do anything to recover his flagship.

Finally, Cochrane ordered Guise to take Esmeralda out of the bay, beginning to move outward along with all the boats and two captured gunboats; the one that watched at the entrance of the floating chain and another that had approached the frigate during the climax of the fight. The batteries, observing that and understanding the situation, began to fire to prevent Esmeralda's removal. The ships and gunboats also attacked her. Several shots hit the Esmeralda, one entered through one of the stern windows and damaged the quarterdeck, causing the death of some men and wounding Coig, who was being held prisoner there.
 
In these circumstances, the neutral ships USS Macedonian and HMS Hyperion began to move away from the bay to get out of reach of the batteries. At the same time, they placed lamps in their rigging as pre-arranged signals to avoid attack. Cochrane realized this and, understanding its meaning, ordered identical lamps in Esmeraldas rigging. This caused confusion in the batteries that could not determine which of the three ships with lights was the captured frigate, showing reluctance to direct their shots to the foreign ships, so that at approximately 1:15 a.m. their fire began to decrease.

Esmeralda left the port and around 2:30 a.m. anchored out of range of batteries near O'Higgins. With it came all the smaller boats, towing the two captured gunboats. A little known fact referred by an eyewitness of the attacking forces affirms that one of the boats that belonged to O'Higgins had gone astray, and that during the rest of the night the batteries continued to open fire, without understanding the reason. The doubts disappeared when the sun appeared and the missing boat was seen leaving the port, towing a large gunboat that it had captured, quickly receiving assistance.

Aftermath

Analysis
Chilean naval researcher Jorge Ureta Muñoz affirms that the main factors that contributed to the successful capture of the frigate are due to the coordination of the details, the general idea of a proven plan, the efficient and energetic driving represented by Cochrane itself and the value of its participants. It also highlights the great importance that the realization of a naval action of this type can have, in the sense that with proportionately smaller means an extraordinary advantage can be obtained by dislocating material or mentally to the adversary, at a minimum cost.

The Spanish historian Fernández Duro compares this naval action with the capture of the Hermione, in Puerto Cabello, in 1799, but affirming that he surpasses it in daring.

According to Spanish historiography, the attack was verified during a ceasefire.

Effects

Legacy
In 1855, by means of a supreme decree issued on 26 June, the Chilean government gave the name of Esmeralda to a corvette that had been built in the United Kingdom for the Chilean Navy. That name was given to him in memory of the frigate that was captured in this naval action. Also the signal "Gloria" and "Victoria", used by Cochrane during the boarding attack, was awarded to the corvette as its motto. This corvette perpetuated the name of Esmeralda in the future ships of the navy, due to his reckless performance in the battle of Iquique on 21 May 1879, during the development of the Pacific War. Currently, the sixth vessel that bears the name is the Esmeralda (BE-43).

The Chilean historian Barros Arana indicated in his book written in 1894 that this naval action has been the battle of the Spanish American wars of independence that has been narrated in a greater number of times in diverse historiographies works.

Notes

References

Bibliography

External links
 Captura de la "Esmeralda" - 5 y 6 de noviembre de 1820 – Official site of the Chilean Navy. (in Spanish)

Esmeralda
Esmeralda